Spring in My Hometown is a 1998 South Korean film.

Synopsis
A story about two village boys, Sungmin and Changhee, in the summer of 1952, during the Korean War.

Cast
 Ahn Sung-ki ... Sungmin's father
 Bae Yoo-jung ... Changhee's mother
 Cho Jae-hyun
 Kim Jungwoo ... Changhee
 Lee In ... Sungmin
 Myeong Gye-nam
 Myeong Sun-mi
 Oh Ji-hye ... Teacher
 Song Ok-sook ... Sungmin's mother
 Yu Hye-jeong
 Yu Oh-seong ... Sungmin's uncle

Awards

Wins
 Entrevues Film Festival (1998)
 Grand Prix Foreign Film (Spring in My Hometown)
 Hawaii International Film Festival (1998)
 Best Feature Film (Spring in My Hometown)
 Pusan International Film Festival (1998)
 FIPRESCI Prize - Special Mention (Lee Kwang-mo) "For the director's mature approach to the consequences of recent Korean history on common people's lives."
 Thessaloniki Film Festival (1998)
 Special Artistic Achievement (Lee Kwang-mo)
 Tokyo International Film Festival (1998)
 Gold Award (Lee Kwang-mo)
 Fribourg International Film Festival (1999)
 Don Quixote Award (Lee Kwang-mo)
 Grand Bell Awards (1999)
 Best Film
 Kerala International Film Festival (1999)
 Special Jury Prize (Lee Kwang-mo)

Nominations
 Stockholm Film Festival (1998)
 Bronze Horse (Lee Kwang-mo)
 Thessaloniki Film Festival (1998)
 Golden Alexander (Lee Kwang-mo)

Notes

Bibliography
 
 
 

 "Hope, Despair, and Memory of the Koreans' War: Spring in My Hometown," Minjung Kim and Trenia Walker, Education About Asia 7.1 Spring 2002 (Free access after registration)

1998 films
1990s Korean-language films
Best Picture Grand Bell Award winners
Korean War films
South Korean war drama films